Mörsenbroich is an urban quarter of Düsseldorf, part of Borough 6. It borders on Unterrath, Rath, Derendorf, Grafenberg and Düsselthal.

In the region around Düsseldorf is the "Mörsenbroicher Ei" ("Mörsenbroich egg") well-known, because there is large traffic-jam every morning. The Mörsenbroich egg is a place, where the federal highway A 52 ends and the traffic goes into the city of Düsseldorf. It crosses the federal road B 7 and two main roads of Düsseldorf, one of them is the ring road going along outside the central district of Düsseldorf.

References

Morsenbroich